The British National Railway Museum is in York, England.

National Railway Museum may also refer to:

Africa
 Nairobi Railway Museum, Kenya
 South African National Railway And Steam Museum, South Africa
 Railway Museum (Zambia), Livingstone, Zambia
 Bulawayo Railway Museum, Zimbabwe

Asia
 National Rail Museum, New Delhi, India

Americas
 Canadian Railway Museum, Canada
 National Railway Museum (Peru), Tacna, Peru
 National Railroad Museum, Green Bay, Wisconsin, United States

Europe
 Train World, Belgium
 Danish Railway Museum, Denmark
 Finnish Railway Museum, Finland
 Cité du Train, Mulhouse, France
 DB Museum, Germany, part of the Nuremberg Transport Museum
 Railway Museum of Athens, Greece
 Hungarian Railway History Park, Hungary
 Railway Museum (Netherlands) (Dutch National Railway Museum), Netherlands
 Norwegian Railway Museum, Norway
 National Railway Museum (Portugal), Portugal
 Slovenian Railway Museum, Ljubljana, Slovenia
 Railway Museum (Madrid), Spain
 Swedish Railway Museum, Gävle and Ängelholm, Sweden

Elsewhere
 National Railway Museum, Port Adelaide, Adelaide, South Australia, Australia

See also
 National Railway Museum Shildon, a co-museum of the UK's National Railway Museum, now called Locomotion